Thomond Park is a stadium in Limerick in the Irish province of Munster. The stadium is owned by the Irish Rugby Football Union and has Munster Rugby, Shannon RFC and UL Bohemian RFC as tenants. Limerick FC played home games in Thomond Park from 2013 to 2015 in the League of Ireland while the Markets Field was being redeveloped. The capacity of the stadium is 25,600 following its large-scale redevelopment in 2008.

History
The stadium holds a special place in rugby due to its own unique history and atmosphere. The stadium is famed for its noise during play and the complete silence while home and away players are kicking for goal. Munster also retained an intimidating 12-year unbeaten run at Thomond in the Heineken Cup—running from the competition's start in 1995 until 2007 when the Leicester Tigers broke the streak with a 13–6 win. On 31 October 1978 Munster celebrated their historic 12–0 victory over the All Blacks in front 12,000 fans at Thomond Park.

Pre redevelopment
Thomond Park (named after the medieval kingdom of Thomond) originally consisted of two pitches, the main pitch and a training pitch. The main pitch was bounded on all sides by terracing with a stand above the west terrace. The training pitch was behind the west stand with the Shannon R.F.C. pavilion in the southwest corner of the ground. The UL Bohemian R.F.C. pavilion was within the west stand.

Traditionally, the former terracing and four sides of the pitch had local nicknames, however they have since fallen out of local parlance. The most famous of these was the east terrace, which was known among fans as the "Popular side", this sat opposite the "Stand side", joining the "City End" (South Terrace) with the "Ballynanty End" (North Terrace). The "Popular side" gained notoriety in local rugby folklore for the colourful comments that can be heard emanating from local wags and alickadoos in the direction of the pitch, occasionally drawing reaction from players and officials, to the amusement of other attendants.

Prior to redevelopment, the official capacity of Thomond Park was 13,000. The highest pre-redevelopment official attendance in Thomond Park was 18,000 people and occurred in 1992 in a local derby in the All-Ireland League between clubs Shannon RFC and Garryowen FC.

Redevelopment
In 1998 and 1999, following the introduction of the professional era, the Irish Rugby Football Union (IRFU) spent several million pounds on floodlighting, terracing, toilets, medical facilities and a new pitch for the ground. In January 2006, the Munster Branch of the IRFU made offers to buy some adjacent houses to expand the stadium. In March 2006 the IRFU and Munster Rugby announced that Thomond Park was unanimously selected for the site of the branch's new stadium, and in May 2006 the design for the re-development was unveiled. Work started in early 2007, and the project was completed for a re-opening in Autumn 2008.

The principal elements of the project saw the erection of two new stands adjacent to the existing main pitch, with a seating capacity of 15,100 and terrace capacity of 10,530, or 25,630 in all.

It was thought that Thomond Park would be renamed in a sponsorship deal, following its redevelopment. However, it was confirmed in February 2008 that the name Thomond Park would remain the same, with naming rights being sold for the individual stands instead.

Atmosphere
Thomond Park is well known for its atmosphere. During a rugby match, the home fans can be heard singing songs such as "The Fields of Athenry" and "Stand Up and Fight". These two songs play a vital role in Munster rugby as they are Munster's anthems. Donal Spring, one of the heroes of 1978, credits the spectators for its unique ethos: "What's so special about Thomond Park? The crowd. Simply the crowd. The atmosphere is electric. Of all the places I've played, playing with Munster at Thomond Park is what I’ve enjoyed most."

The home crowd is also famous for its silence when a team's kicker is kicking for goal. This has been known to put the away team's kicker off, although it is done out of respect.

In August 2013 Thomond Park was awarded the title of 'Best Rugby Stadium in the World' following a vote by rugby supporters across the globe.

Ireland Internationals
Limerick has hosted 13 Ireland internationals, 12 of which were held at Thomond Park, four of which were full internationals. The results are as follows:

Updated as of 22 April 2021.

Updated as of 22 April 2021.

Rugby World Cup Matches

Other sporting fixtures
Thomond Park held the Irish heats of the 2011 Special Olympics World Summer Games over the course of four days in June 2010.

Football
At Thomond Park, Limerick F.C. played Shamrock Rovers in the League of Ireland Shield, BSC Young Boys in the 1960 European Cup and Torino in the 1971 European Cup Winners' Cup. From 2013 to 2015, Limerick F.C. played Airtricity League home fixtures at Thomond Park. They also have played Manchester City FC twice in friendlies in 1992 and 2012.

The Republic of Ireland national football team played two international friendlies in Thomond during the construction of the Aviva Stadium. The first, on 12 August 2009 against Australia drew a crowd just above 19,000. Australia won 3–0. Ireland played and defeated South Africa 1–0 at Thomond on 8 September 2009 to a crowd of 11,300.

Thomond hosted an International Champions Cup match between Internazionale and Celtic on 13 August 2016 with Internazionale winning 2–0.

Rugby League
On 5 November 2011, the stadium hosted its first Rugby league game when Ireland took on France. On 9 November 2013, Thomond Park hosted Ireland's 2013 Rugby League World Cup Group A match with Australia.

Concerts
Elton John – 6 June 2009
Rod Stewart – 4 July 2009
P!nk with guest Butch Walker – 20 June 2010 – Funhouse Summer Carnival Tour
Bob Dylan with guests David Gray, Seasick Steve & Alabama 3 – 4 July 2010
The Cranberries – 9 June 2010 (Special Olympics opening ceremony – their first performance in their native city for over 15 years)
JLS - 26 June 2011 with guest Olly Murs - JLS Tour
Bruce Springsteen – 16 July 2013 – Wrecking Ball Tour
Ed Sheeran – 5 and 6 May 2022 – +–=÷x Tour

Attendances
The highest pre-redevelopment official attendance in Thomond Park came in 1992 when a local derby in the All-Ireland League between clubs Shannon RFC and Garryowen FC saw an attendance of 18,000 people. Munster's average league attendance for the 2013–14 Pro12 season was 12,334 Munster's average league attendance for the 2014–15 Pro12 season was 13,179, the third highest in the league.

See also
 Stadia of Ireland

Notes

Notes and references

External links
  Official website
  Photo slideshows taken during the construction of the New Stadium

Rugby union stadiums in Ireland
Rugby World Cup stadiums
Sports venues in Limerick (city)
Munster Rugby
Republic of Ireland national football team home stadiums
Sports venues in County Limerick
Rugby league stadiums in Ireland
Rugby League World Cup stadiums